Maksym Mykolayovych Serdyuk (born 21 May 2002 in Chernihiv) is a Ukrainian professional footballer who plays as a midfielder for FC Chernihiv in the Ukrainian Second League.

Player career

FC Chernihiv
Serdyuk started his career in FC Chernihiv, which became a professional club in 2020 when it joined the Ukrainian Second League. He made his professional debut in the 2020–21 Ukrainian Second League against Rubikon Kyiv. On 1 May 2021 he scored the winning goal against Bukovyna at the Chernihiv Arena. On 18 August he played in the 2021–22 Ukrainian Cup against Chaika Petropavlivska Borshchahivka, replacing Andriy Makarenko in the 63 minute.

On 16 October 2021 he scored his first goal of the 2021-22 Ukrainian Second League season against Lyubomyr Stavyshche at the Kolos Stadium in Stavyshche.

On 27 August 2022 he made his debut for the 2022–23 Ukrainian First League season against Skoruk Tomakivka at the Yunist Stadium in Chernihiv.

Career statistics

Club

References

External links
 Maksym Serdyuk at FC Chernihiv 
 
 

2002 births
Living people
Footballers from Chernihiv
FC Chernihiv players
Ukrainian footballers
Association football midfielders
Ukrainian Second League players
Ukrainian First League players